Outcast is a 1937 American drama film directed by Robert Florey. Unusually for Florey, this was an independent production (Emanuel Cohen Productions, billed as "Major Pictures Corporation") released through Paramount Pictures.

Plot
Warren William plays a Baltimore doctor accused of murder.  Although acquitted, he becomes a pariah and his practice is ruined, so he transplants himself to a small Wisconsin town. Confiding with a sympathetic retired lawyer (Lewis Stone), the doctor just begins to build back his practice, his self-respect, and a relationship with a local girl (Karen Morley) when his past follow him in the form of the avenging sister of the murder victim.

Cast

References

External links
 
 
 Online review with photographs

1937 films
Films directed by Robert Florey
Paramount Pictures films
Films set in Wisconsin
Films scored by Ernst Toch
American black-and-white films
1937 drama films
American drama films
1930s American films
1930s English-language films